John A. Watkins (8 March 1898 – 26 February 1973) was an American politician from the U.S. state of Indiana. Between 1949 and 1953 he served as Lieutenant Governor of Indiana.

Life
John Watkins was born in Marion, Grant County in Indiana. There is not much information available about his youth and education. Later he published several newspapers in Indiana. During World War I he served in the US-Forces and in World War II he belonged to the US occupation troops in Germany, where he became the military commander of the city of Bamberg. Watkins was a Member of various institutions and organizations. In 1940 and 1941 he was the President of the American Legion section for Indiana.

He joined the Democratic Party and in 1948 he was elected to the office of the Lieutenant Governor of Indiana. He served in this position between 10 January 1949 and 12 January 1953 when his term ended. In this function he was the deputy of Governor Henry F. Schricker and he presided over the Indiana Senate. After the end of his political career he continued his work in the newspaper business. John Watkins died on 26 February 1973 in Indianapolis.

External links
 The Political Graveyard
 Online Biography at the Indiana Journalism Hall of Fame

1898 births
1973 deaths
Lieutenant Governors of Indiana
Indiana Democrats